Johannes Anthonie Balthasar Stroebel (1821 – 1905), was a Dutch painter.

Biography
He was born in The Hague where he became a student of the art academy under Bartholomeus Johannes van Hove and his son Huib.  He became a member of the Pulchri Studio in the Hague and Arti et Amicitiae in Amsterdam, and is known for genre works of interiors in the style of Pieter de Hooch. He was active in The Hague, Leiderdorp, and Renkum.
He died in Leiden.

Gallery

Literature 
 Benno Tempel, Ronald de Leeuw: Het Romantiek Boek (biography, p. 354–355). Waanders Uitgevers, Zwolle, 2006.

References

J.A.B. Stroebel on Simonis & Buunk website
Johannes Anthonie Balthasar Stroebel on Artnet

1821 births
1905 deaths
Artists from The Hague
19th-century Dutch painters
Dutch male painters
19th-century Dutch male artists